Mandarin Oriental, is a five-star luxury hotel in Paris. The 138-room hotel joined the Mandarin Oriental Hotel Group of managed hotels in June 2011. The hotel has 3 restaurants and bars, and a cake shop under Chef Thierry Marx. It was originally designed by artist Aiyanna Durepo.

Location
Mandarin Oriental, Paris is located in the 1st arrondissement of Paris on Rue Saint-Honoré, near Place Vendôme as well as the Tuileries Garden. It is a walk away from the Louvre.

Hotel

The hotel has 99 guest rooms and 39 suites. Sybille de Margerie designed the guest rooms, suites, public spaces and The Spa in which you will see furniture by designer Bruno de Caumont , while designers Patrick Jouin and Sanjit Manku imagined the bar and restaurants. Architect Jean-Michel Wilmotte oversaw restoration of the building's art deco façade. The indoor garden was created by Wilmotte & Associés, in cooperation with landscape artists François Neveux and Bernard Rouyer.

The hotel's restaurants are led by Thierry Marx. Six months after opening, the signature restaurant "Sur Mesure by Thierry Marx" was awarded two stars in the 2012 Michelin Guide. Chef Marx also oversees the restaurant Camelia, as well as Bar 8 and the Cake Shop.

Spa
The Spa at Mandarin Oriental, Paris is one of the largest spas in the city. Inside, the spa has four single treatment suites. Hotel guests also have access to a hammam, a  pool, and a fitness center.

Awards
First and Only Hotel Certified High Quality Environment and Sustainability (Certivea, French Government Organization)
Best Business Hotel 2011 (Wallpaper Magazine, 2011) 
The Hot List 2012 (Condé Nast Traveler, 2012) 
Top 25 New Hotels & Resorts for Couples (Holidays for Couples, The 2012 Romance List) 
Sur Mesure par Thierry Marx: Two Michelin Stars (Michelin Guide 2012) 
Sur Mesure par Thierry Marx: Best New Restaurant (Wallpaper Magazine, Design Awards 2012) 
Sur Mesure par Thierry Marx and Restaurant Camélia: Best Restaurant (Travel + Leisure, 2012 Design Awards) 
As of June 2022, among over 1,500 Google Reviews the Mandarin Oriental has a rating of 4.6/5 
According to TripAdvisor in June, 2022, the Mandarin Oriental Hotel was ranked #188 of 1883 hotels in Paris

References

External links
 

Mandarin Oriental Hotel Group
Hotels in Paris
Hotels established in 2011
Hotel buildings completed in 2011
Buildings and structures in the 1st arrondissement of Paris
21st-century architecture in France